Aili Vint (born 25 April 1941 in Rakvere) is an Estonian graphic designer and painter.

In 1967, she graduated from Estonian State Art Institute.

1964–1970, she was a member of ANK '64. Since 1970, she is a freelance artist.

Awards
 1994: Konrad Mägi prize
 1994: City of Pärnu prize
 2002: Order of the White Star, IV class
 2015: Kristjan Raud prize

References

External links
 

Living people
1941 births
Estonian women painters
20th-century Estonian women artists
20th-century Estonian painters
21st-century Estonian painters
Estonian designers
Estonian Academy of Arts alumni
Academic staff of the Estonian Academy of Arts
Recipients of the Order of the White Star, 4th Class
People from Rakvere
Estonian graphic designers